The Berlin Fortress (German "Festung Berlin") was the fortification of the historic city of Berlin.  Construction started in 1650.  The demolition of its ramparts began in 1740.

History 
Berlin was an important market place on the main east-west route (today Bundesstraße 1). However, it had no real fortifications, unlike Spandau in the west (Spandau Citadel) and Köpenick in the east (Köpenick Palace). Although Berlin was not the site of any battles during the Thirty Years' War (1618–1648) it suffered heavily from the Swedish occupation; by the end of the war in 1631, a third of the buildings had been demolished and half the population had fled or died.

Frederick William I, Elector of Brandenburg ordered the engineer architect Johann Gregor Memhardt to make plans for a fortification for the town. These began in 1650 following the contemporary fortification model of bastions in northern Italy. Large ramparts were erected and the space between was filled with water.

The construction of the parts east of the river was finished between 1658 and 1662.  There were more problems with the western parts due to the swamps in the area and accordingly these were not finished until 1683. However, the ramparts on that side never reached their intended height.

In the following years the ramparts deteriorated to such an extent that Frederick William I of Prussia decided to abandon them in 1734. In their place the Berlin Customs Wall was erected, a project that continued until 1737. In 1740 work began to demolish the walls of the fortress, but it was not until the end of the 19th century that all of the ramparts had been levelled. Today nothing remains apart from an echo of its path as shown by the zig-zag routes taken by some streets in the city center.  A map can be seen in the Berlin Stadtbahn of railway tracks which were built along the eastern (northern) section where the fortress had been.

Fortifications 

The Berlin Fortress had five city gates and 13 bastions.

 Leipzig Gate (Leipziger Tor)
 Köpenick Gate (Köpenicker Tor)
 Mills Gate (Mühlentor)
 Georges Gate (Georgentor),  originally named after the Hospital Saint-Georges it was renamed to King's Gate (Königstor) in 1701
 Spandau Gate (Spandauer Tor)
 New Town Gate (Neustädtisches Tor) added in direction of the western planned town Dorotheenstadt which was supposed to be fortified as well but these plans were never realized.
 I. Leib-Garde-Bollwerk (Gießhaus-Bastion)
 II. „Wittgensteinsches“ Bollwerk
 III. „Sparr“-Bollwerk (Jäger-Bastion)
 IV. Gertrauden-Bollwerk (Spittel-Bastion)
 V. „Goltzsches“ Bollwerk (Salz-Bastion)
 VI. „Rillenfortsches“ Bollwerk (Heubinder-Bastion)
 VII. Bollwerk „im Sumpf“ (Köpenicker Bastion)
 VIII. Stralauer Bollwerk
 IX. Kloster-Bollwerk (Hetzgarten-Bastion)
 X. „Siebenburgisches“ Bollwerk (Marien-Bastion, Kommandanten-Bastion
 XI. Dragoner-Bastion
 XII. „Uffelnsches“ Bollwerk (Spandauer Bastion)
 XIII. Lustgarten-Bollwerk

Literature 
 : Als Berlin eine Festung war …, 1658–1746. In: Der historische Ort Nr. 27. 2. Auflage. Kai Homilius Verlag, Berlin 2006,  (26 Seiten im Taschenkalender-Format).

Demolished buildings and structures in Germany
Demolished buildings and structures in Berlin
History of Berlin
Walls
17th-century fortifications
Buildings and structures demolished in 1740